Gabo: The Creation of Gabriel Garcia Marquez (also known as Gabo, The Magic of Reality) is a 2015 Colombian documentary directed by Justin Webster about the life story of award-winning writer Gabriel García Márquez.

Awards

References

External links 
 
 

Colombian documentary films
2015 documentary films
2015 films
2010s Spanish-language films
Gabriel García Márquez
2010s English-language films
Documentary films about writers